The Gravelly Range, highest peak Black Butte, el. ,  is a  mountain range southwest of Cameron, Montana in Madison County, Montana.

About 310,000 acres total are roadless, separated by roads into nine units, the largest of which is 66,000 acres in size. Nearly all the range is part of the Beaverhead-Deerlodge National Forest. In the northern part of the range is the Bureau of Land Management's Axolotl Lakes Wilderness Study Area, 7,804 acres in size, which is part of a larger roadless area of 47,000 acres. The Axolotl Lakes WSA is home to a unique form of indigenous tiger salamander. This part of the Gravellies is characterized by open foothills rising to mixed coniferous forest interspersed with meadows. Some of the highest-elevation pronghorn habitat in Montana is found here. 

On the eastern slope of the Gravellies, Cave Mountain is home to unique undisturbed grasslands and caves that attract spelunkers. The most rugged part of the range is a 52,870-acre roadless area centered on 10,281' Big Horn Mountain, with deep canyons, cliffs, steep benches, and undulating basins.

The largest roadless area in the Gravellies features rolling basins cut by rocky canyons, old Native American campsites along the Gravelly Divide, and westslope cutthroat trout in the remote canyons of the Elk River.

The southeastern part of the range, near the Continental Divide, features a chain of lakes that provide homes to nesting trumpeter swans and bald eagles. Grizzly bears have recently been confirmed to be living in the Gravellies.

See also
 List of mountain ranges in Montana

Notes

Mountain ranges of Montana
Landforms of Madison County, Montana